Lucien Henri Nonguet (10 May 1869  – 22 June 1955) was a  French film director, actor and screenwriter. He was one of the first film director and screenwriter of the Pathé company.

Biography
Lucien Nonguet was born on 10 May 1869 in Poitiers, the son of dramatic artist Josué Nonguet (1831-1881). He was first an actor and director of extras at the theatre, among others at the Châtelet and l'Ambigu.

Nonguet was hired on at Pathé in 1901 as assistant to Ferdinand Zecca and director of figuration. This function, which in the theatre consisted of recruiting and directing actors for the needs of a play, was to become the forerunner of the director's job at the beginning of the cinema. Zecca and Nonguet began a series of important collaborations, starting in 1901 with Quo Vadis, based on the eponymous novel by Henryk Sienkiewicz. This was followed by the féérie, La Belle au bois dormant, in 1902. The best known of the Zecca/Nonguet collaborations is the 44 minutes silent film Vie et Passion du Christ, released in 1903.

Nonguet also directed alone a number of films at Pathé, specialising in historical reconstructions or reconstructed Actuality films, composed of a series of tableaux, filmed in long shots with no camera movement, and often based on photographs or paintings of the events depicted. Épopée Napoléonienne (1903), a two-part epic of the life of Napoleon seems to have been the model upon which Pathé's later histories and actualities were based. Other historical films directed by Nonguet include La Révolution en Russie (1905) and La Saint Barthelemy (1905).

In 1920, Lucien Nonguet left the Pathé company to become director of the Alhambra-Saint-Ouen cinema.

Selected filmography
 1902 : Quo Vadis
 1902 : La Belle au bois dormant
 1903: Massacres de Macédonie
 1903: Assassinat de la famille royale de Serbie
 1903: Le Pape Léon XIII au Vatican
 1903: La Mort du pape Léon XIII
 1903: Épopée napoléonienne - Napoléon Bonaparte
 1903: Épopée napoléonienne - L'Empire / L'Empire, grandeur et décadence 
 1903: Guillaume Tell
 1903: Don Quichotte
 1903: Le Chat botté
 1903: Vie et Passion du Christ
 1904: Évènements russo-japonais (several short films)
 1904: L'Assassinat du ministre russe de l'Intérieur Viatcheslav Plehve
 1904: L'Incendie du théâtre Iroquois à Chicago
 1905: Vie et passion de notre seigneur Jésus-Christ
 1905: Les Troubles de Saint-Pétersbourg
 1905: La Saint-Barthélémy
 1905: La Révolution en Russie 
 1905: Au Pays Noir, d'après Germinal by Émile Zola
 1905: Atrocités antisémites russes
 1905: L'Assassinat du grand-duc Serge
 1905: L'Incendiaire
 1905: Les Petits vagabonds
 1905: Dix femmes pour un mari
 1905: Les Martyrs de l'Inquisition
 1906: Pour la fête de sa mère
 1906: Terrible angoisse
 1906: Les Dessous de Paris
 1907: Idée d'apache
 1907: À Biribi, disciplinaires français
 1907: Une mauvaise vie
 1907: La Vie de Polichinelle
 1908: Victime de sa probité
 1908: Le Bébé
 1908: La Belle au bois dormant
 1908: Le Roman d'un malheureux
 1908: L'Affaire Dreyfus, co-directed with Ferdinand Zecca.
 1919: Les Trois potards
 1919: Frédy chef costumier
 1919: Les Deux paillassons
 1920: Une institution modèle
 1907 to 1914: Several films in the series Max, starring Max Linder.
 1905 to 1913: Several films in the series Gontran, starring .

References

External links
 Lucien Nonguet Filmography at the British Film Institute website
 Lucien Nonguet Filmography (in French) at Fondation Jérôme Seydoux-Pathé
 

1869 births
1955 deaths
Fantasy film directors
French film directors
Silent film directors